Damodaram Sanjivayya National Law University (DSNLU) is a National Law University located at Sabbavaram, Anakapalli district, Andhra Pradesh, India constituted by the DSNLU Act, 2008. It offers 5 year integrated B.A LLB. (Hons.) course to eligible Undergraduate students based on the   Common Law Admission Test centralized admission process. The University offers postgraduate courses also, including the one-year LL.M. programme and, PhD and LL.D. programmes. The university is housed at Nyayaprastha in Sabbavaram with 75.5 acres built up area in the first phase. The establishing Act of 2008 of the Andhra Pradesh Legislative Assembly (Act No. 32 of 2008), had provided the main campus at Visakhapatnam.

Academics
DSNLU is one of the National Law Universities of India in the National Law University system of legal education in India. It has a similar academic structure as other National Law Universities within the system. It regularly organises seminars and conferences, and recently organised an event on Taxation, titled, "National Conference on Contemporary Aspects of Direct Tax" held on 16 March 2019.

DSNLU conducts teaching in law and allied disciplines, with emphasis on practical training of the students in technical skills of the profession through Moot Courts, Seminars, Project Reports, Expert Lectures, work and internships in law chambers, Court visits and conducting Legal aid and Legal literacy camps in parts of the country, with one being "Abhyeti" conducted in Bhopal.

Admissions
Admissions to DSNLU are made through the Common Law Admission Test (CLAT), which serves as the qualifying examination for the university. Out of a total of 120 seats, 60 are reserved for students from the state of Andhra Pradesh, 48 for all India General category and 12 for NRI and foreign national candidates.

Moot court
The first national moot court competition of DSNLU was held on 15 & 16 February 2014. The second national moot court competition was held by the University on 6 to 8 March 2015. The third national moot was conducted in the last week of February, 2017. Along with the national moot, the University conducted a statewide moot for the students of Telangana and Andhra Pradesh, the 1st D.V. Subba Rao Memorial Moot Court competition on 11 and 12 April 2015 in honour of D. V. Subba Rao, an advocate and legal luminary of Visakhapatnam.

Administration
The government appointed Prof. A. Lakshminath as the first Chancellor, Y. Satyanarayana as the First Vice-Chancellor and Amancherla Subrahmanyam as the first Registrar of the university. After the DSNLU Amendment Act, 2016 had been notified, the Hon'ble Chief Justice of the High Court of Andhra Pradesh is the ex-officio Chancellor of the University. The current chancellor of DSNLU is Hon'ble Justice C. Praveen Kumar and Vice-Chancellor is Prof. S. Surya Prakash and the Registrar Prof.(Dr.) C. M. Rao.

Vice chancellors

Faculty

The faculty of DSNLU includes faculties from various National Law Universities like National Law School of India University, Gujarat National Law University, NALSAR, The West Bengal National University of Juridical Sciences, National Law University, Jodhpur, Chanakya National Law University, Hidayatullah National Law University, Dr. Ram Manohar Lohia National Law University.

In addition to the permanent staff, eminent jurists, judges, lawyers and academicians serve as guest faculty. Members of the World Intellectual Property Organization, Tata Institute of Social Sciences and many other eminent personalities take guest lectures.

References

External links
 Official website DSNLU website

Law schools in Andhra Pradesh
National Law Universities
Universities and colleges in Visakhapatnam
Educational institutions established in 2008
2008 establishments in Andhra Pradesh
State universities in Andhra Pradesh